This list of churches in Nord-Hålogaland is a list of the Church of Norway churches in the Diocese of Nord-Hålogaland which includes all of Troms og Finnmark county in Norway. The diocese is based at the Tromsø Cathedral in the city of Tromsø.

The list is divided into several sections, one for each deanery in the diocese. Each  is led by a provost. Administratively within each deanery, the churches are divided by municipalities which have their own church council. Each municipal church council may be made up of one or more parishes, each of which may have their own council. Each parish may have one or more congregations in it.

Tromsø domprosti 
This arch-deanery is home to the Tromsø Cathedral, the seat of the Bishop of the Diocese of Nord-Hålogaland.  Tromsø domprosti covers the two municipalities of Tromsø and Karlsøy.  The deanery is headquartered at Tromsø Cathedral in the city of Tromsø.  Administratively, the territory of Svalbard is also part of the Tromsø domprosti, although it is not part of the county. The Tromsø arch-deanery has been around since the Reformation in Norway.  Before 1922, it was called the Tromsø stiftsprosti.

Alta prosti 
This deanery covers the western part of Finnmark.  The deanery is headquartered in the town of Alta in Alta Municipality.  It includes the three municipalities of Alta, Hasvik, and Loppa.  The deanery was established on 14 May 1864 when the old Vest-Finnmark deanery was split into Alta prosti and Hammerfest prosti.  Originally, Kautokeino Municipality was part of the Alta prosti, but on 1 April 1991, Kautokeino was moved to the newly created Indre Finnmark prosti.

Hammerfest prosti 
This deanery the northern part of Finnmark.  The deanery is headquartered at the Hammerfest Church in the town of Hammerfest in Hammerfest Municipality.  The deanery covers the five municipalities of Gamvik, Hammerfest, Lebesby, Måsøy, and Nordkapp.  The deanery was established on 14 May 1864 when the old Vest-Finnmark and Øst-Finnmark deaneries were split into Alta prosti, Hammerfest prosti, and Varanger prosti.  The new Hammerfest prosti took the Lebesby parish from Øst-Finnmark and the rest came from Vest-Finnmark.  Originally, Karasjok and Porsanger municipalities were part of the Hammerfest prosti, but on 1 April 1991, both were moved to the newly created Indre Finnmark prosti.

Indre Finnmark prosti 
This deanery (also called Sis-Finnmárkku proavássuohkan in the Northern Sami language) covers five municipalities in the southern part of Finnmark county.  The deanery is headquartered at the Karasjok Church in the village of Karasjok in Karasjok Municipality.  This deanery was established on 1 April 1991 when parts of the three existing deaneries were transferred to this new Sami-majority deanery:  Kautokeino (from Alta prosti), Porsanger and Karasjok (from Hammerfest prosti), and Tana and Nesseby (from Varanger prosti).  At , this is the largest deanery in Norway by size.  This deanery is also the only deanery in Norway with a majority of members being Sami people, which is why the Northern Sami language is the administrative language for the deanery.  Services are held in both Norwegian and Sami languages.

Nord-Troms prosti 
This deanery covers six municipalities in the northern part of Troms: Gáivuotna–Kåfjord, Kvænangen, Lyngen, Nordreisa,  Skjervøy, and Storfjord.  The deanery is headquartered at the Nordreisa Church in the village of Storslett in Nordreisa Municipality. The deanery was created in its present form in 1998 when the Indre Troms prosti was established and Balsfjord was transferred there. At that time, the name of the deanery was changed from Troms prosti to Nord-Troms prosti.

Senja prosti 
This deanery covers three municipalities on and around the island of Senja.  The deanery is headquartered in the town of Finnsnes in Lenvik Municipality.  The deanery includes the municipalities of Dyrøy, Senja, and Sørreisa.  The deanery was established around the year 1750 when the large Tromsø domprosti was divided and the southern part became the new Senjens prosti.  On 1 January 1860, the southern part of the deanery was split off to become the new Trondenes prosti.  A royal resolution by the King on 19 May 1922 changed the name of the deanery from Senjen to Senja.

On 1 January 2020, the old Indre Troms prosti was merged with Senja prosti. Indre Troms was in existence from 1998 until 2019. It covered five municipalities in the southeastern part of Troms county: Balsfjord, Bardu, Lavangen, Målselv, and Salangen. The deanery was headquartered in the village of Bardufoss in Målselv Municipality.  The deanery was created in 1998 by transferring Bardu and Målselv municipalities from Senja prosti, Balsfjord from Troms prosti, and Lavangen and Salangen from Trondenes prosti. The old Troms prosti was renamed Nord-Troms prosti at the same time.

Trondenes prosti 
This deanery covers five municipalities in the southwestern part of the county.  The deanery is headquartered in the town of Harstad in Harstad Municipality.  It includes the five municipalities of Gratangen, Harstad, Ibestad, Kvæfjord, and Tjeldsund.  This deanery was established on 1 January 1860 when the old Senja prosti was divided into two deaneries: Senja in the north and Trondenes in the south. Lavangen and Salangen were transferred from here to Indre Troms prosti in 1998.

Varanger prosti 
This deanery covers the eastern part of Finnmark in the areas surrounding the Varangerfjorden and the areas on the Varanger Peninsula.  The deanery is headquartered at Vadsø Church in the town of Vadsø in Vadsø Municipality.  The deanery includes the five municipalities of Berlevåg Båtsfjord, Sør-Varanger, Vadsø, and Vardø.  Varanger prosti was established on 14 May 1864 when the old Øst-Finnmark prosti was dissolved, moving Lebesby prestegjeld to the newly created Hammerfest prosti and the rest of the old deanery became Varanger prosti.  Originally, Tana and Nesseby municipalities were part of the Varanger prosti, but on 1 April 1991, both were moved to the newly created Indre Finnmark prosti.

References

 
 
Nord-Haalogaland